Open Season is the second album from the Brighton-based English band, Sea Power, then known as "British Sea Power". It was released on 4 April 2005 to positive reviews. It showcased a more accessible, mainstream sound and reached No. 13 in the UK Albums Chart. Almost all of the songs on the album were recorded with Mads Bjerke, who had previously worked with the band on their 2003 album, The Decline of British Sea Power and also with Primal Scream, Girls Aloud and Spiritualized, and mixed by Bill Price, with the exceptions of "Please Stand Up" and "North Hanging Rock", which were produced and mixed by Graham Sutton and engineered by Phill Brown. "Oh Larsen B" was recorded by George Apsion and Tariq Zaid Al-Nasrawi. Two singles were released from the album, "It Ended on an Oily Stage" (UK No. 18) and "Please Stand Up" (UK No. 34).

When the CD is rewound 2:31 before the first track, an organ version of the song "How Will I Ever Find My Way Home?" is found.

The lyrics and title of "Oh Larsen B" refer to the Antarctic Peninsula ice shelf Larsen B, which collapsed in 2002, a few years before the release of the album.

Track listing
"It Ended on an Oily Stage" (Hamilton/Noble/Wood/Yan) – 4:23
"Be Gone" (Yan) – 2:52
"How Will I Ever Find My Way Home?" (Hamilton) – 3:11
"Like a Honeycomb" (Yan) – 4:31
"Please Stand Up" (Yan) – 3:07
"North Hanging Rock" (Yan) – 4:26
"To Get to Sleep" (Hamilton/Noble/Wood/Yan) – 3:16
"Victorian Ice" (Yan) – 3:26
"Oh Larsen B" (Yan) – 5:30
"The Land Beyond" (Hamilton) – 4:01
"True Adventures" (Hamilton) – 7:52

Japanese release bonus track
"Don't You Want to Be a Bird?" (Hamilton) – 2:55

Personnel
 Yan – vocals, guitar, piano, organ
 Hamilton – vocals, bass guitar, guitar, piano, organ, backing vocals
 Noble – guitar, piano, backing vocals, organ
 Wood – drums

Additional personnel
 Abi Fry – viola
 Phil Sumner – cornet
 Graham Sutton – string arrangements and additional programming
 Axl – miniature Italian greyhound

Release history

References

British Sea Power albums
2005 albums
Rough Trade Records albums